Anne or Ann Fleming may refer to:

 Anne Fleming (model), American actress and model
 Anne Fleming (writer) (born 1964), Canadian author
 Ann Fleming (1913–1981),  British hostess known for her marriage to Ian Fleming
 Ann Marie Fleming (born 1962), Asian-Canadian filmmaker, writer, and visual artist